Re is a remix album by French pop rock group Les Rita Mitsouko. It was released in 1990 and includes the singles "Hip Kit" and "Don't Forget the Nite". The album is compilation of new remixes, 12" single remixes and a new re-recording.

Receiving mixed reviews the album was originally released as a Double-LP, 5x12" single, Cassette and CD in October 1990. The artwork was designed by Judith E. Christ with photography by Stephane Sednaoui. Catherine Ringer and Fred Chichin pose in clothing designed by Jean-Paul Gaultier.

Conception
The album was conceived by Fred Chichin as a remix project material from the group's first three studio albums (Rita Mitsouko (1984), The No Comprendo (1986) and Marc & Robert (1988)). Chichin remixed half of the material under the alias 'Fat Freddy'. The remaining tracks are remixes by William Orbit, Mark Moore and Jesse Johnson compiled from former singles. The group's 1982 single "Don't Forget the Nite" was completely re-recorded for the project with producer Tony Visconti.

Singles
William Orbit's remix of "Hip Kit" was released as the first single backed with Fat Freddy's mix of their 1986 single "Andy". The re-recording of "Don't Forget the Nite" was released as the second single the following year. The 7" was backed with the original 1982 recording. The twelve-inch was backed with Fat Freddy's mix "Nuit d'ivresse". Neither single charted.

Track listing

Personnel
Tony Visconti and Les Rita Mitsouko - Producer (all tracks except "Marcia Baïla" and "Jalousie")
Conny Plank - Producer ("Marcia Baïla" and "Jalousie")
Pascal Garnon - Engineer ("Nuit d'ivresse", "Le Petit Train", "Andy Live", "Jalousie")
Raphael - Mastering
Jacques Robakowsky - Special Mastering
Stephane Sednaoui - Photography
Judith E. Christ - Graphic Design
Jean-Paul Gaultier - Clothing

References

External links
Re release history
Full recording credits at discogs.com

Les Rita Mitsouko albums
Albums produced by Tony Visconti
Albums produced by Conny Plank
1990 remix albums
Virgin Records remix albums